Sundahl is a surname. People with that name include:

 Jonas Erikson Sundahl (1678-1762), Swedish-born architect who spent most of his working life in Germany
 Roland Sundahl (1930-1952), American murderer

See also
 Sundal, a village in Mauranger district, Kvinnherad municipality, Hordaland county, Norway
 Sunndal, a municipality in Møre og Romsdal county, Norway